This is a list of games and applications for the Nintendo DSi handheld game console available for download via the DSi Shop in the PAL region.

200 Points
There are  titles in Europe (133 in Australia), set at 200 Nintendo Points each unless otherwise noted.

500 Points
There are 217 titles in Europe (182 in Australia), set at 500 Nintendo Points each unless otherwise noted.

800+ Points
There are 84 titles in Europe (71 in Australia), set at 800 Nintendo Points each unless otherwise noted.

Applications
There are 29 titles in Europe (26 in Australia).

Note: The Legend of Zelda: Four Swords is a free game for a limited time on DSiWare, available from September 28, 2011 to February 20, 2012.

Notes
 On , Nintendo released an update for Nintendo DSi Browser. The update includes improvements to the application and reduced the total blocks size needed to install. DSi owners may update their browser by redownloading the application from the DSi Shop.
 Dictionary 6 in 1 with Camera Function was given a price of 800 points when it was released, but Nintendo of Europe reduced the price to 500 points on the same day.
 Although UNO was given a price of 800 points in Japan and North America, it was released in Europe with the price of 500 points.
 Later manufactured Nintendo DSi consoles, and all Nintendo DSi XL consoles, come with the Nintendo DSi Browser and Flipnote Studio pre-installed on the system. Older Nintendo DSi consoles can download these applications for free from the Nintendo DSi Shop.
 On , Nintendo of Europe released the Nintendo DSi XL which comes with A Little Bit of... Dr. Kawashima's Brain Training: Arts Edition and Dictionary 6 in 1 with Camera Function pre-installed on the system. Dr. Kawashima's Brain Training: Arts Edition and Photo Clock pre-installed on the system.
 With the launch of the Nintendo eShop for the 3DS in June 2011, new games would be added on Thursdays at midnight CET.
 On , the ability to add DSi Points for the purchase of new games on the DSi Shop was removed, followed by the closure of the DSi Shop on March 31, 2017. However, DSiWare games available on the Nintendo eShop have remained unaffected.

See also
 List of DSiWare games and applications
 List of DSiWare games (North America)
 List of Nintendo DS games
 Nintendo DSi System Software
 List of WiiWare games
 List of WiiWare games (PAL region)
 List of Nintendo 3DS games
 List of Wii U software

References

External links
 Nintendo of the UK's DSiWare title list

DSiWare